Bradley Central High School is a public high school located in Cleveland, Tennessee that serves approximately 1,700 students from grades 9-12. It was founded in 1916, and is part of the Bradley County Schools system. The school maintains a crosstown rivalry with Cleveland High School, as well as fellow county rival Walker Valley High School.

History
The school opened its doors on September 11, 1916, and was the second public high school in the county, after Charleston High School in Charleston, which opened in 1913. The original campus was located on the present site of Ocoee Middle School, and was called Central High School at first. It was renamed Bradley County High School in 1920 and Bradley Central High School in 1948. The school was moved to its current location on South Lee Highway (U.S. 11/64) in 1972.

Athletics
Bradley competes in the Tennessee Secondary School Athletic Association (TSSAA) and its sports are:
Baseball (state champions 1994)
Basketball (state champions 1940, 1942, 1962)
Bowling
Cheerleading
Cross Country
Football (state champions 1961, 1976)
Golf
Softball
Soccer
Tennis
Track and Field
Volleyball (state championships 1982, 1991, 1993, 1994)
Wrestling (27 state championships total)

Demographics
96.6 percent of the students are white, while two percent are Hispanic, 1.1 percent are African American, 0.1 percent are Asian, 0.1 percent are Pacific Islander and 0.1 are Native American.

Notable alumni
Mike Bell, Tennessee state senator
Anthony Burger, southern gospel singer and musician attended but did not graduate
Ryan Casteel, current professional baseball player
Charles Paul Conn, president of Lee University
Chad Copeland, basketball player
Rex Dockery, former football college head coach
Dee Gibson, former professional basketball player
Rhyne Howard, current women's basketball player
Brittany Jackson, former professional basketball player  
Dale Jones, former professional football player and football college coach
Tim Long, former professional football player
Toby McKenzie, businessman and entrepreneur
Terrence Oglesby, professional basketball player in the International Basketball Federation
Christian Pitre, actress
Alvin Scott, former professional basketball player 
Steve Sloan, former football college head coach
Ray Stephens, former professional baseball player

References

External links
School Web site

Public high schools in Tennessee
Bradley County Schools
Educational institutions established in 1916
1916 establishments in Tennessee